Mackenzie Alexander Astin (born May 12, 1973) is an American actor.

Early and personal life
Astin was born on May 12, 1973, in Los Angeles, California, the son of actress Patty Duke and actor John Astin. His brother is actor Sean Astin. He attended Ralph Waldo Emerson Middle School and University High School in Los Angeles. He is married to Jennifer Abbott Astin (née Bautz).

Career
Astin made his acting debut at age 9 in the TV movie Lois Gibbs and the Love Canal, and is often remembered for the adolescent television role of Andy Moffett over four seasons from 1985 to 1988 on the sitcom The Facts of Life. He has had recurring roles on Scandal, The Magicians, and Homeland, and has made guest appearances on LOST, House, Psych, Grey's Anatomy, and NCIS.

Astin has appeared in motion pictures including Iron Will with Kevin Spacey, Wyatt Earp with Kevin Costner, The Evening Star with Shirley MacLaine, and Whit Stillman's The Last Days of Disco.

In November 2020, Astin was cast in a recurring role on the third season of the Netflix psychological thriller series You.

Filmography

Awards
CAMIE Awards
 2005: Won, "Character and Morality in Entertainment" – Love's Enduring Promise (shared w/producers, co-stars)

Young Artist Awards
 1986: Won, "Best Young Supporting Actor in a Television Series" – The Facts of Life

References

Further reading
 Dye, David. Child and Youth Actors: Filmography of Their Entire Careers, 1914–1985. Jefferson, NC: McFarland & Co., 1988, p. 7.

External links
 
 
 

1973 births
Living people
20th-century American male actors
21st-century American male actors
American male child actors
American male film actors
American male television actors
Male actors from Los Angeles
University High School (Los Angeles) alumni